Candy bar refers to a variety of confectioneries that are shaped in a bar form

Candy bar may also refer to:
 Chocolate bar, a confection in bar form that contains chocolate
 CandyBar, a Mac OS X icon application
 Candy Barr, a mid-20th century striptease artist
 Dylan's Candy Bar, a candy store in New York City
 Candybar phone, a form factor (shape and layout) of a mobile phone
 Candy Bar (London), a lesbian bar in Soho that shut in 2014
 "CandyBar", a song by Cara Jones from Now
 "Candi Bar", a song by Keith Murray from He's Keith Murray